Majda Pajnkihar (born 28 August 1959) is former Dean of the Faculty of Health Sciences at the University of Maribor, Slovenia. She is one of the founding members of Udine-C Network (Understanding Development Issues in Nurse Educator Careers), an international research group with the main interest in nursing careers.

Education
Pajnkihar is a Registered Nurse  with a Bachelor of Organizational Sciences and a Master of Organizational Sciences from the University of Maribor and a PhD in nursing from the University of Manchester.

Career
Pajnkihar was the first Slovenian to obtain a Nursing PhD in Slovenia and led the establishment of the first Nursing PhD program there. On her initiative the first Institute for Nursing in Slovenia was established in 1996. Pajnkihar was the first head of the Institute for Nursing, which aims to recognize nursing as a scientific discipline and a profession.

She is a member of Sigma Theta Tau the Honor Society of Nursing.

Pajnkihar’s clinical area is child and adolescent nursing.

She has a special interest in nursing theories and research on caring, qualitative research and evidence-based nursing in the area of patient safety, diabetes  and efficient patient care.

Awards
Pajnkihar is a Fellow (2018) of the American Academy of Nursing and a Fellow of the European Academy of Nursing Sciences.

Publications
Pajnkihar has 25 publications listed on Web of Science that have been cited more than 150 times, giving her an h-index of 7. Her three most-cited articles are:

Book
McKenna HP, Pajnkihar M, Murphy F (2014) Fundamentals of nursing models, theories and practice Wiley Blackwell, Chichester

References

External links

Fellows of the American Academy of Nursing
Nursing researchers
Slovenian nurses
Living people
Academic staff of the University of Maribor
Alumni of the University of Manchester
1959 births